According to classes and categories of public roads in Poland, a voivodeship road is a category of roads one step below national roads in importance. The roads are numbered from 100 to 993.

List of voivodeship roads
Current list of voivodeship roads has been established with regulation of General Director of National Roads and Motorways from 2 December 2008 and modified with regulation from 11 December 2009.

100–199

200–299

300–399

400–499

500–599

600–699

700–799

800–899

900–993

See also

Roads and expressways in Poland

References

 V